Pomacea doliodes is a species of freshwater snail, an aquatic gastropod mollusk in the family Ampullariidae, the apple snails.

References 

diffusa
Gastropods described in 1856